Roby is an unincorporated community in Christian County, Illinois, United States. The town was the site of the 1997 standoff with Shirley Allen.

References

Unincorporated communities in Christian County, Illinois
Unincorporated communities in Illinois